{{DISPLAYTITLE:C5H7NO2}}
The molecular formula C5H7NO2 may refer to:

 Ethyl cyanoacetate
 Piperidinediones
 2,3-Piperidinedione
 2,4-Piperidinedione
 2,5-Piperidinedione 
 2,6-Piperidinedione 
 3,4-Piperidinedione
 3,5-Piperidinedione
 1-Pyrroline-5-carboxylic acid